The 2001 Iraqi Perseverance Cup was the 6th edition of the Iraqi Super Cup. The match was contested between Baghdad rivals Al-Zawraa and Al-Quwa Al-Jawiya at Al-Shaab Stadium in Baghdad. It was played on 17 September 2001 as a curtain-raiser to the 2001–02 season. Al-Quwa Al-Jawiya won their second Super Cup title, winning the match 1–0.

Match

Details

References

External links
 Iraq Football Association

Football competitions in Iraq
2001–02 in Iraqi football
Iraqi Super Cup